The 1956 European Cup final was the inaugural final in the pan-European football competition, the European Cup, now known as the UEFA Champions League. It was contested by Real Madrid of Spain and Reims from France, and played at the Parc des Princes in Paris on 13 June 1956 in front of 38,000 people. Real Madrid reached the final by beating Italian side Milan 5–4 on aggregate, whereas Reims beat Scottish club Hibernian 3–0 on aggregate. The match finished 4–3 to Real Madrid, who went on to record an unrivalled five consecutive European Cup titles. The match started brightly for Reims, with Michel Leblond and Jean Templin scoring to make it 2–0 inside 10 minutes, but by half-time, Madrid had levelled the scores through goals from Alfredo Di Stéfano and Héctor Rial. Reims took the lead again on 62 minutes through Michel Hidalgo, but when Marquitos and Rial scored in the 67th and 79th minutes respectively, Reims could no longer respond, winning  Madrid the first ever European Cup/Champions League title, the first of five consecutive titles that they won.

Route to the final

Real Madrid
Real Madrid entered the European Cup competition as the title winners of the 1954–55 La Liga. In the opening round, they were drawn with Swiss champions Servette. After they secured a 2–0 victory away from home in the first leg, they secured a 5–0 victory at the Santiago Bernabéu Stadium with Alfredo Di Stéfano scoring two goals in the victory. In the quarter-finals they were drawn against Yugoslavian side FK Partizan who had finished fifth in the previous season. In the opening leg at home, Heliodoro Castaño Pedrosa scored two goals as fellow goals from Francisco Gento and Alfredo Di Stéfano gave Real Madrid a four goal lead heading into the away leg at Belgrade.

Match

Details

See also 
1955–56 European Cup
1959 European Cup final – contested between same teams
Real Madrid CF in international football competitions

Notes

References

External links 
European Cup 1955/56 from UEFA
European Cup 1955/56 from RSSSF

1
European Cup Final 1956
European Cup Final 1956
European Cup Final 1956
1956
European Cup Final
European Cup Final
European Cup Final
European Cup Final